Joanna of Pfirt (– 15 November 1351) was the Countess of Pfirt in her own right from 1324 and Duchess of Austria as consort of Duke Albert II from 1330 until her death.

Life 
Born in Basel, Joanna was the eldest daughter of Count Ulrich III of Pfirt (1281–1324), a descendant of the Scarponnois count Theodoric I of Montbéliard, and his wife, Joanna of Burgundy (1284–1349).

Inheritance  
When Reginald of Burgundy, the last Count of Montbéliard from the Chalon-Arlay dynasty, died in 1321, his daughter, Joanna of Montbéliard (Joanna of Pfirt's mother), inherited her father's domains. Joanna and Ulrich III  had four daughters and no sons. When Count Ulrich died in March 1324, he left large estates in the Alsatian Sundgau, in the southern Vosges Mountains with the strategically important Burgundian Gate, and in the northern Jura foothills. Ulrich's surviving legacy was his two daughters, Joanna of Pfirt and her younger sister Ursula (1315–1367).

Duke Leopold I of Austria was head of the Habsburg dynasty since the death of his father, King Albert I of Germany, in 1308. He concentrated on the administration of the family's Further Austrian territories in Swabia, while his brother Frederick the Fair rivalled with King Louis the Bavarian. When Leopold found out that the late Count of Pfirt's daughter, Joanna was still unmarried, he sent his younger brother Albert II to make the official request to Joanna of Montbéliard for her daughter's hand. With the lands of Pfirt, Joanna was an attractive party. Joanna ceded her domains (including the town of Belfort) to the House of Habsburg, whereby the dynasty could add a large contiguous territory in Southern Alsace to its Swabian possessions. The treaty between Joanna and Duke Leopold was sealed on March 17 at Thann.

Joanna's mother was however remarried to Rudolf Hesso, Margrave of Baden-Baden and had two more daughters: Margaret and Adelaide.

Marriage 

Joanna married Albert II in Vienna on 26 March 1324. At first the marriage went off unhappily. Joanna was considered to be well into child bearing years. The couple had children early in their marriage, but they were all short-lived (all buried in St. Stephen's Cathedral, Vienna). In total, Albert and Joanna had five short-lived children throughout their marriage.

Albert II succeeded as Duke of Austria and Styria upon the death of Frederick the Fair in 1330. However, at the same time, he fell ill with polyarthritis which paralyzed his legs, which seemed to preclude producing heirs. For divine aid, the duke went on a pilgrimage to Cologne and Aachen in 1337. Two years later, when Joanna was in her late thirties, she gave birth to a son and continued to have children.

In total Albert and Joanna had six surviving children:
 Rudolf IV, Duke of Austria (November 1, 1339, Vienna – July 27, 1365, Milan). Married but line extinct.
 Catherine (1342, Vienna – 10 January 1381, Vienna), Abbess of St. Klara in Vienna.
 Margaret (1346, Vienna – 14 January 1366, Brno), married:
 in Passau 4 September 1359 Count Meinhard III of Gorizia-Tyrol;
 in Vienna 1364 Margrave Johann Heinrich of Moravia.
 Frederick III, Duke of Austria (1347, Vienna – 1362, Vienna). Died unmarried.
 Albert III, Duke of Austria (September 9, 1349, Vienna – August 29, 1395, Castle Laxenburg). Had issue.
 Leopold III (November 1, 1351, Vienna – July 9, 1386, Sempach). Had issue.

Joanna was described as wise and prudent. She was said to be politically talented and smart. In 1336, Joanna mediated the peace between the Habsburg family and the rising House of Luxembourg over the heritage of the late Duke Henry of Carinthia. The Habsburgs later gained further possessions up to the Adriatic coast, formerly held by the Patriarchs of Aquileia. Through Joanna, Albert and the Habsburgs gained more lands since she was an heiress. Even though there was peace, wars could break out if it promised benefits for Albert and the Habsburgs, who were growing to be one of the most powerful royal families in Europe. After Albert had purchased the Duchy of Carinthia with the Carniolan and Windic marches, he did not need allies anymore.

Joanna had children unusually late. When she was fifty-one, she gave birth to her final child, a son, Leopold III, Duke of Austria, and died soon after. She is buried in the Gaming Charterhouse with her husband and daughter-in-law, Elisabeth of Bohemia.

Ancestry

References

1300 births
1351 deaths
14th-century Austrian women
Austrian countesses
Austrian royal consorts
Austrian people of French descent
14th-century House of Habsburg
14th-century women rulers
Deaths in childbirth

Year of birth uncertain